The Mother of Good Counsel Minor Seminary is the minor seminary of the Archdiocese of San Fernando, in the Pampanga province of the Philippines.  It  houses sixty-two minor seminarians. Its current director is Rev. Fr. Jayson V. Miranda and its current spiritual director is Rev. Fr. Mark Simbul.

Image gallery

History 
Bishop Guerrero established the Mater Boni Consilii (now Mother of Good Counsel) Seminary in 1950. It was originally in Guagua, then Apalit, before moving to its present site in San Fernando.

References

Seminaries and theological colleges in the Philippines
Schools in San Fernando, Pampanga
1950 establishments in the Philippines